The Institute in Basic Life Principles (IBLP) is a non-denominational Christian organization that serves as an umbrella organization for several ministries. The IBLP, which has been described as a cult, was established by American Christian minister, Bill Gothard. The stated purpose of the organization is to provide instruction on how to find success in life by following biblical principles. This involves programs that include seminars for ministry, community outreach, troubled youth mentoring, and an international ministry. Children are expected to be home schooled, to always obey their fathers, and adhere strictly to IBLP's interpretations of biblical Scripture.

IBLP maintains a post office box in Oak Brook, Illinois (Box One, though the former headquarters building is actually located in nearby Hinsdale, Illinois) as well as a large facility in East Texas near the town of Big Sandy which according to its "Contact Us" site is the organization's headquarters.

History
IBLP was originally organized in 1961 under the name Campus Teams.  The organization changed its name to Institute in Basic Youth Conflicts (IBYC) in 1974 (consistent with the title of its founder's seminar title), and adopted its current name in 1989 (to reflect its expansion beyond the seminars). IBLP started promoting Basic Youth Conflicts seminars in areas around the United States and other nations, which according to its own history, during the 1970s had attendances of up to 20,000 persons.

In 2006, IBLP was reported to earn  (equivalent to about $M in ) annually.

From 2009 to 2012, the Institute in Basic Life Principles began a steady decline, losing money, assets, and greatly decreasing the number of annual seminars it conducted, while the public became increasingly aware of controversy (more specifically, allegations of sexual misconduct) associated with IBLP.  The controversy led to Gothard resigning in 2014, though not admitting to anything more than "a violation of trust".  The following year, according to Chicago Magazine, IBLP relocated its headquarters to Texas; IBLP's website does not mention this move.  The former IBLP headquarters building has been the subject of several redevelopment proposals according to the Hinsdale official website.

Programs and teachings

In addition to adherence to the Bible and Christian ideals, the IBLP considers males, in particular the patriarch of a family, to be superior, whereas females are expected to obey men in every way. This includes in the home, school, workplace, and marriage. 

Women are raised to learn how to become good wives and mothers, and to birth and raise children for the IBLP men chosen by the women’s fathers to be their husbands; couples are matched after a complex courtship overseen by both sets of parents. Women are not allowed to date or flirt, and all attempts at flirting, as well as wearing makeup, perfume, nail polish and high heels, is seen as lustful. Women are also discouraged from attaining a higher education.

The consumption of media, such as television, movies, most music and the internet, is not allowed, though non-contemporary Christian music is accepted. Dancing is not allowed, and the consumption of alcohol is also banned.

Women are expected to wear ankle-length dresses and to never cut their hair; the presence of text printed onto dresses is not allowed, as it is thought to bring attention to the body. Men are expected to wear dark suits and white shirts, and blue jeans are seen as ungodly. Men are also expected to be circumcised, as being uncircumcised is seen as being unpure.

Children are homeschooled, and do not often leave the complex, if at all. Sexual education is not part of IBLP teachings, leading some children and teens to not understand what sexual assault is, and the practice of not teaching sexual education has been criticised by adults who have since left the IBLP and struggle with relationships. The Bible is read daily, and everyone is expected to spend time meditating on its messages.

Children are taught to obey God's message and the rules of their fathers, and that violation of this leads to bad consequences, such as contracting a cold. "Real-world consequences at IBLP included scoldings, intense counseling, demotions, and even being kicked out altogether."

Teaching on Marriage 
IBLP’s curriculum focuses heavily on the roles and responsibilities of men and women within a marriage covenant. A husband's authority over his wife is God-given, as is his wife's non-negotiable duty to submit to him; She must respect his position regardless of his "deficiencies." Within marriage, IBLP teaches that God “grants spouses full access to each other’s bodies for sexual gratification” and warns against “resistance or indifference to a husband’s need for physical intimacy". Wives and children are occasionally referenced as "goods" belonging to the husband, which may be subjected to torment by Satan himself should the husband remove the home's spiritual protection by harboring unconfessed sins. A married women should not seek financial independence, take "matters into her own hands,” resist her husband’s physical affection, or ask for outside counsel without her husband’s permission. Inwardly, married women are admonished to nurture a meek and quiet spirit, while outwardly maintaining beauty, remaining "well-groomed", and striving to dress to "please their husbands".

Allegations and investigations
A number of former adherents of IBLP programmes have described the organization and/or associated circles as a cult. Don Veinot, president of Midwest Christian Outreach, says that the charismatic leader, authoritarian control, isolation of members, severe punishments, and demand for absolute and blind loyalty add up to IBLP being "cult-like"; MCO does not consider IBLP a "cult" due to its (official) support of traditional Christian doctrine (MCO reserves that label for groups which officially deviate from such).

In the 1980s, the organization faced "a major sex scandal" when Gothard's brother, Steve Gothard, resigned as administrative director after having affairs with several secretaries of the institute.  According to accounts reported by Midwest Christian Outreach founders Ron and Joy Veinot (in their book A Matter of Basic Principles), the board recommended that Bill (who also admitted to sexual misconduct) resign from the board, which he did, only to take advantage of an ensuing power struggle to regain his position and control of IBLP, thereafter filling board positions with people absolutely loyal to him.

In 2014, Gothard resigned as President of IBLP after reports that he had once again sexually harassed multiple women and failed to report allegations of child abuse in the organization. Gothard allegedly selected young women for administrative positions within the organization, then manipulated and harassed them while in his employment, several of whose stories were featured on the website of Recovering Grace, a website and Christian ministry that functions as a support group for former students and members of IBLP. An investigation into the allegations by the IBLP board concluded he did not act "criminally" but did act "inappropriately", and (notwithstanding their loyalty to Gothard) notified him that he was permanently disqualified from returning to the organization in any capacity.

On October 20, 2015, a civil lawsuit alleging a sex-abuse cover-up involving several minors was filed in DuPage County, Illinois against IBLP and its board of directors. Gretchen Wilkinson et al. vs. Institute in Basic Life Principles and William W. Gothard Jr. was brought on behalf of five female plaintiffs in order to "seek redress and damages for personal injuries based on the negligent and willful and wanton acts and omissions of the defendants with regard to sexual abuse and sexual harassment and similar allegations of malfeasance suffered by the plaintiffs." "Besides monetary damages, they have asked a DuPage County judge to bar IBLP leaders from alleged plans to liquidate resources estimated at more than $100 million while they close the institute's headquarters near Oak Brook and relocate to Texas, the lawsuit states." Five additional accusers joined the suit in January 2016, and even more in February 2016, bringing the grand total of complainants to 16 women and two men. The case was voluntarily dismissed on February 26, 2018 due to statute of limitations.

References

External links
 

Christian charities based in the United States
Charities based in Illinois
Charities based in Texas
Christian organizations established in 1961